Kumarapala may refer to:

 Kumarapala (Chaulukya dynasty) (1143–1172 CE), a Solanki king from western India
 Kumarapala (Pala king) (c. 1130–1140 CE), a Pala king from eastern India